Lisbon Region is one of the seven NUTS II designated regions of Portugal, which coincides with the NUTS III subregion Lisbon Metropolitan Area. The region covers an area of 3001.95 km2 (the smallest region on mainland Portugal)   and includes a population of 2,815,851 inhabitants according to the 2011 census (the second most populated region in Portugal after the Norte region), a density of 1039 inhabitants/km2.

Considered as representing the Lisbon Metropolitan Region. It is a region of significant importance in industry (light and heavy), services, and it is highly urbanized. The gross domestic product (GDP) of the region was 73.3 billion euros in 2018, accounting for 36% of Portugal's economic output. GDP per capita adjusted for purchasing power was 30,200 euros or 100% of the EU27 average in the same year. The GDP per employee was 92% of the EU average.

History
Prior to 2002, the area was included within the NUTS II region of Lisbon and Tagus Valley (that also included three other subregions). Before 2015, the region was divided into two NUTS III subregions: Grande Lisboa and Península de Setúbal.

NUTS II region and area of intervention of the CCDRLVT

"Despite the territorial configuration for statistical purposes (National Statistical System in Portugal), in force since 2002, matching the NUTS II the Lisbon, Region Greater Lisbon (AML) - composed only NUTSIII Greater Lisbon and Setúbal Peninsula - the area of intervention of the CCDRLVT - Steering Committee and Regional Development, abbreviated to CCDR - (the Lisbon and the Tagus Valley), continues to be composed of 5 NUTSIII (Sub-regions: Greater Lisbon, Setúbal Peninsula, Middle Tagus, and Lezíria West Coast).

For the Regional Funds, management responsibilities under the policy of the European Union in Portugal, this regions it's the region of Lisbon that consists of Grande Lisboa and Península de Setúbal, for regional planning (Run, monitor and evaluate, at regional level, policies on environment, nature conservation, land management and city) the region is called Lisbon and the Tagus Valley (LVT), composed by 5 NUTSIII (Sub-regions: Greater Lisbon, Setúbal Peninsula, Middle Tagus, and Lezíria West Coast)."

Municipalities
The 18 municipalities:
Alcochete
Almada
Amadora
Barreiro
Cascais
Lisboa
Loures
Mafra
Moita
Montijo
Odivelas
Oeiras
Palmela
Seixal
Sesimbra
Setúbal
Sintra
Vila Franca de Xira

References 
Notes

Sources

External links

 CCDR-LVT Comissão de Coordenação e Desenvolvimento Regional de Lisboa e Vale do Tejo

 
NUTS 2 statistical regions of the European Union
NUTS 2 statistical regions of Portugal